The Oromo people of East Africa are divided into two major branches: the Borana Oromo and Barento Oromo. Borana and Barento in Oromo oral history are said to be brothers who were the sons of Orma, father of all Oromos. These two major groups are in turn subdivided into an assortment of clan families. From West to East and North to South, these subgroups are listed in the sections below.

Borana Oromo subgroups 
The Borana include:
Borana
Walaabu
Karrayyuu 
Macca Oromo, living between Didessa River and the Omo River, and south into the Gibe region
Gaaroo
Sirba
Libaan
Jaawwii
Daal'ee
Tulama Oromo, who live in the Oromia Region around Addis Ababa
Ada'a
 Handha
 Illuu
 Dhakku
Daaccii
Oboo
Diigaluu
Eekka
Guulaalee
Gumbichuu
Konnoo
Yaayee
Galaan
Aabuu
Adaa
Gaduulaa
Jiddaa
Warji
Libaan
Soddo
Libaan
Odituu
Tummee
Bachoo
Garasuu
Illu
Meetaa
Atomsa
Lelissa
Feysa
Ararssa
Gumataw
Ormaa
Dayyaa
Komboo
 The Guji Oromo, who inhabit the southern part of Oromia, neighbouring the Borana Guttuu and the Sidama people.
Hokkuu
Kabalah
Uragaa
 The Borana Oromo, also known as Boraan Guttuu, who live in the Borena Zone.
 
 The Orma people, who live in northeastern Kenya

Other subdivisions.

Barento Oromo subgroups 
The Barento include:
 Karrayyu
Libaan
 Wallo
Warra Himanoo
Warra Waayyuu
Warra Buukkoo
Warra Heebanoo
Warra Illu 
Warra Baabboo
Warra Qalluu
Warra Qobboo
Warra Raayyaa fi Asseboo
Warra Yejjuu
 Ala 
Warra Abbaddo
Warra Abbayi
Warra Arroji
Warra Babbu
Warra Diramu
Warra Erer
Warra Galaan
Warra Goollo
Warra Gutayyu
Warra Kako
Warra Metta
Warra Nunnu
Warra Aade
Warra Agaay
Jille
Warra Olid
Warra Waaed
Daga
Huumee
Warra Hiyyo
Warra Walaabu
Warra Sayyo
Warra Ogaa
Warra Ugadhiho
Warra Dhanka
Haleele Noole
Mucaa Noole
Warra Abbayi
Warra Babbu
Warra Guyyee
Oromo Noole
Warra Bukee
Warra Eegu
Warra Jidda
Warra Maaru
Warra Naya’a
Warra Wacalle
 Abuu Noole
Warra Jarte
Warra Dhanqa
Warra Ogoo 
Warra Mohamed

Warra Garrir
Warra Gatu
Obborra
 Billi
Hinne
Godaana
 Akkichu
 Dagga
Warra Dadaroo
Warra Guttu
Warra Nunnu
 Dorani
 Marawa 
Ittu
 Qallu Ittu
 Baaye Ittu
 Babbo Ittu
 Arojji Ittu
 Gadulla Ittu
 Gaamo Ittu
 Waayye Ittu
 Galan Ittu
 Wacaale Ittu
 Elele Ittu
 Addayo Ittu
 Momajii Ittu
 Alga Ittu 
 Dhumuga
Warra Heela
Warra Akkiyaa
Warra Kajaammo
Warra Heebaana
Warra Asallaa
 Arsi (Arse)
Mandoo Arsi
Warra Bulla
Warra Wacallee
Warra Waajii
Warra Ilaan
Warra Hawaxa
Warra Utaa
Warra Jawwii
Sikko Arsi
Warra Wayyu
Warra Harawa
Warra Biltu
Warra Kajawa
Warra Rayya
 Humbanna
 Aniyaa 
Saddacha
Warra Babbu
Warra Dambi
Warra Malka
Kudhelle
Warra Aanaa
Warra Biddu
Warra Koyye
Warra Maccaa
 Afran Qallo which refers to the 4 decedents of Qallo, who are: Oborra, Daga, Babile and Ala 
Ala
Warra Abbaddo
Warra Abbayi
Warra Arroji
Warra Babbu
Warra Diramu
Warra Erer
Warra Galaan
Warra Goollo
Warra Gutayyu
Warra Kako
Warra Metta
Warra Nunnu
Warra Aade
Warra Agaay
Jille
Warra Olid
Warra Waaed
Daga
Huumee
Warra Hiyyo
Warra Walaabu
Warra Sayyo
Warra Ogaa
Warra Mohamed
Warra Ugadhiho
Warra Dhanka
Haleele Noole
Mucaa Noole
Warra Abbayi
Warra Babbu
Warra Guyyee
Oromo Noole
Warra Bukee
Warra Eegu
Warra Jidda
Warra Maaru
Warra Naya’a
Warra Wacalle
 Abuu Noole
Warra Jarte
Warra Dhanqa
Warra Ogoo 
Warra Mohamed

Warra Garrir
Warra Gatu
Obborra
 Billi
Hinne
Godaana
 Akkichu
 Dagga
Warra Dadaroo
Warra Guttu
Warra Nunnu
 Dorani

Additional subdivisions 
There are additional subdivisions:
 The Qallu, who live between the Awash River and Dire Dawa
 The Gabra people, who live in north Kenya along the Moyale border region
 The Sherifa, who live between the Awash River, Dire Dawa, West Hararghe Zone, Gelemso and East Hararghe Zone Deder Babile, Gursum and Harar.

References

Oromo groups